Rana Ellen Munns  is an Australian scientist who studies salinity tolerance in crop plants.

Career 

BSc (Hons 1st Class) 1966 Biochemistry Department, University of Sydney
Doctor of Philosophy 1972, CSIRO Plant Physiology Unit, University of Sydney.  Chloroplast Development
1973–1976            Senior Tutor, Macquarie University, NSW
1977–1980            Research Fellow, Department of Agronomy, University of Western Australia
1981–2005 Research Scientist CSIRO Plant Industry, Canberra
2005–2010 Chief Research Scientist, CSIRO Division of Plant Industry, Canberra
2011–present Honorary Fellow, CSIRO Plant Industry, Canberra
2011–2013 Winthrop Research Professor, School of Plant Biology, University of Western Australia
2014–present  Emeritus Professor, ARC Centre of Excellence in Plant Energy Biology, jointly with School of Plant Biology

Former Editor-in-chief of Functional Plant Biology

Honours and awards 
 2006 Corresponding Member of American Society of Plant Biologists
 2012 Thomson Reuters Australia Citation Award for most highly cited plant scientist during 2002–2012

References 

Living people
20th-century Australian botanists
20th-century Australian women scientists
Fellows of the Australian Academy of Science
University of Sydney alumni
Academic staff of the University of Western Australia
Year of birth missing (living people)
21st-century Australian botanists